Max Roustan (born September 29, 1944 in Saint-Julien-les-Rosiers, Gard) is a member of the National Assembly of France.  He represents the Gard department,  and is a member of the Union for a Popular Movement.

References

1939 births
Living people
People from Alès
Union for a Popular Movement politicians
Deputies of the 12th National Assembly of the French Fifth Republic
Deputies of the 13th National Assembly of the French Fifth Republic
Senators of Gard